Falcon is an unincorporated community in McNairy County, in the U.S. state of Tennessee.

History
A post office called Falcon was established in 1874, and closed the next year in 1875. For a short time, Falcon served as the county seat.

References

Unincorporated communities in McNairy County, Tennessee